Gerold Joachim Otten (born 7 December 1955) is a retired German Air Force Oberst (Colonel) and politician (AfD). Since 24 October 2017 he has served as member of the Bundestag.

On 9 April 2019, the AfD-group in the Bundestag nominated Otten for the position of Vice President of the Bundestag.

Early life 
Otten grew up in a hamlet near Bremen, his father was a social democratic mayor of Lübberstedt for 25 years.

In July 1975 he joined the Bundeswehr and was trained as a weapon system officer (WSO) for the Phantom and Tornado aircraft. The last three years of his "Bo41" career ("professional officer with the special age limit of 41 years") spent Otten in the multinational training center Tri-National Tornado Training based on RAF Cottesmore for German, British and Italian crews on Tornado, According to what he left in March 1997 in the rank of a major from the Bundeswehr. Subsequently, Otten worked for the aerospace group DASA and was most recently active as a Eurofighter Sales Director in its successor company Airbus Defense and Space. He was a colonel of the reserve at the Air Force Officer School in Fürstenfeldbruck.

Otten lives in Putzbrunn, is divorced and has an adult son.

References

1955 births
German Air Force personnel
Living people
Members of the Bundestag 2021–2025
Members of the Bundestag 2017–2021
Members of the Bundestag for Bavaria
Members of the Bundestag for the Alternative for Germany
People from Osterholz